Ruai is a neighbourhood in the city of Nairobi. It is one of the areas located in the extreme northeast of Nairobi after Kamulu.

Location
It was formerly part of the larger defunct Embakasi division. It borders Njiru and Kamulu. Electorally, Ruai county assembly ward, is placed under Kasarani Constituency; however, Ruai forms part of the larger sub-county of Njiru that spans through neighbourhoods as far as the Outer Ring Road to the furthest northeast up to Kamulu Bridge just before Joska.

Overview
Ruai is laregly an informal neighbourhood in Nairobi; though it is mixed-use in its corresponding urban area of Ruai Town. It is one of the least populated neighbourhoods in the city, especially the residential areas. The neighbourhood exhibits characteristics of a low-density suburb, having single-family dwellings as well as having a mix of a few storey buildings. Ruai also is home to the Dandora Estate Sewage Treatment Works, that treats 120,000m3/day, about 80% of waste water produced in Nairobi.

As per the 2019 census, Ruai had a population of 72,134, with 35,605 of them being male and 36,526 being female. The neighbourhood has a population density of 966/km2 in a land area of 74.7km2.

References

Suburbs of Nairobi